The 40-yard dash is a sprint covering . It is primarily run to evaluate the speed and acceleration of American football players by scouts, particularly for the NFL Draft but also for collegiate recruiting. A player's recorded time can have a heavy impact on his prospects in college or professional football. This was traditionally only true for the "skill" positions such as running back, wide receiver, and defensive back, although now a fast 40-yard dash time is considered important for almost every position. The 40-yard dash is not an official race in track and field athletics, and is not an IAAF-recognized race.

The origin of timing football players for 40 yards comes from the average distance of a punt and the time it takes to reach that distance. Punts average around 40 yards in distance from the line of scrimmage, and the hangtime (time of flight) averages approximately 4.5 seconds; therefore, if a player can run 40 yards in 4.5 seconds, he will be able to leave the line of scrimmage when a punt is kicked, and reach the point where the ball comes down just as it arrives.

Timing method and track comparisons

In terms of judging a person's speed, the best method of timing is through lasers which start and stop the times when passed through. A laser start (from a stationary position) is more accurate for measuring pure speed as it does not register a runner's reaction time, however, this method of timing a 40-yard dash can affect the accuracy by as much as 0.5 seconds with the manual stopwatch method.

The National Football League (NFL) did not begin using partial electronic timing (i.e. started by hand, stopped electronically) at the NFL Scouting Combine until 1999. For purposes of measurement at the Combine, the run is made along the lower sideline from the 40 yard-line to the end zone, which has built-in rundown space, and for electronically timed 40-yard dashes, the runner is allowed to start when they wish, and a timer hand-starts the clock.

In contrast, track and field races have the runner react to a starting gun, which takes approximately 0.24 second (based on FAT timing); further to this, IAAF rules state any runner with a reaction time of less than 0.1 second is subject to disqualification.

This aspect means that comparisons with track times are essentially impossible given that a reaction time is not factored in, and the use of hand-timing in the 40-yard dash can considerably alter a runner's time: the methods are not comparable to the rigorous electronic timing used in track and field.

For example, Jacoby Ford, who ran 4.28 s in the 2010 NFL Combine, had a collegiate best of 6.51 s in the 60-meter dash (outside the top-40 of the all-time lists).

Records

Texas Tech's Jakeem Grant was hand-timed by a New Orleans Saints scout as running a 4.10 in 2016. In the early 1980s, Baylor's Gerald McNeil ran a 4.19-second 40-yard dash before being signed to the United States Football League (USFL). Deion Sanders ran a 4.27-second 40-yard dash in 1989.

In 2013, rugby union Carlin Isles recorded a time of 4.22 at a Detroit Lions facility during a workout.

In 2017, Olympic sprinter Christian Coleman ran a time of 4.12 seconds on turf in response to claims that NFL players are as fast as Usain Bolt.

A year and a half after he retired from active competition, Usain Bolt ran a 4.22 in running shoes and a tracksuit at a promotional event for the Super Bowl in Atlanta, Georgia on February 2, 2019.

NFL Scouting Combine
This is a list of the official 40-yard dash results of under 4.31 seconds recorded at the NFL Scouting combine since 1999, the first year electronic timing was implemented at the NFL Scouting Combine.

Average time by position
According to a five-year NFL combine report, wide receivers and cornerbacks had the fastest average times at 4.48, followed by running backs at 4.49. The following average times were measured between 2000 and 2012 at the NFL combine for players who played at least 5 games.

References

Forty
Sprint (running)
Events in track and field